Aplocnemus is an uncommon genus of beetles native to Europe and the British isles belonging to the family Rhadalidae, and formerly in the Melyridae.

Species

 Aplocnemus abietum Kiesenwetter, 1859
 Aplocnemus acutangulus Schilsky, 1897
 Aplocnemus akbesianus Pic, 1896
 Aplocnemus albipilis Kiesenwetter, 1863
 Aplocnemus alpestris Kiesenwetter, 1861
 Aplocnemus andalusicus (Rosenhauer, 1856)
 Aplocnemus angelinii Liberti, 1995
 Aplocnemus atricornis Pic, 1921
 Aplocnemus aubei Kiesenwetter, 1867
 Aplocnemus barnevillei Kiesenwetter, 1867
 Aplocnemus basalis (Küster, 1849)
 Aplocnemus brevis (Rosenhauer, 1856)
 Aplocnemus brevissimus Pic, 1908
 Aplocnemus caelatus (Brullé, 1832)
 Aplocnemus calidus Mulsant & Rey, 1868
 Aplocnemus castiliensis Schilsky, 1897
 Aplocnemus chalconatus (Germar, 1817)
 Aplocnemus cobosi Pic, 1954
 Aplocnemus coeruleatus (Rosenhauer, 1856)
 Aplocnemus consobrinus (Rosenhauer, 1856)
 Aplocnemus corcyricus Miller, 1866
 Aplocnemus crenicollis (Kiesenwetter, 1863)
 Aplocnemus cribrarius (Brullé, 1832)
 Aplocnemus cribricollis Mulsant & Rey, 1868
 Aplocnemus cribripennis Pic, 1921
 Aplocnemus croceicornis Kiesenwetter, 1863
 Aplocnemus cylindricus Kiesenwetter, 1863
 Aplocnemus difficilis Holdhaus, 1923
 Aplocnemus duplicatus Kiesenwetter, 1871
 Aplocnemus escalerai Pic, 1908
 Aplocnemus gracilicornis Schilsky, 1897
 Aplocnemus grancanariensis Lindberg, 1953
 Aplocnemus hispanicus Pic, 1954
 Aplocnemus impressus (Marsham, 1802)
 Aplocnemus integer Baudi di Selve, 1873
 Aplocnemus jejunus Kiesenwetter, 1863
 Aplocnemus kaszabi Majer, 1982
 Aplocnemus kiesenwetteri Schilsky, 1897
 Aplocnemus korbi Schilsky, 1897
 Aplocnemus koziorowiczi Desbrochers, 1871
 Aplocnemus latior Pic, 1908
 Aplocnemus limbipennis Kiesenwetter, 1865
 Aplocnemus macedonicus Pic, 1922
 Aplocnemus montivagus (Rosenhauer, 1856)
 Aplocnemus nevadensis Pic, 1908
 Aplocnemus nigricornis (Fabricius, 1792)
 Aplocnemus pectinatus (Küster, 1850)
 Aplocnemus pellucens Kiesenwetter, 1865
 Aplocnemus pertusus Kiesenwetter, 1859
 Aplocnemus ponferradanus Pic, 1913
 Aplocnemus pristocerus Kiesenwetter, 1859
 Aplocnemus pulverulentus (Küster, 1850)
 Aplocnemus quercicola Mulsant & Rey, 1868
 Aplocnemus ramicornis Kiesenwetter, 1863
 Aplocnemus raymondi Deville, 1908
 Aplocnemus rufipes Miller, 1862
 Aplocnemus rufomarginatus Perris, 1869
 Aplocnemus rugulosus (Rosenhauer, 1856)
 Aplocnemus sahlbergi Mayor, 2007
 Aplocnemus sculpturatus Wollaston, 1862
 Aplocnemus serbicus Kiesenwetter, 1863
 Aplocnemus serratus (Brullé, 1832)
 Aplocnemus serrulatus Schilsky, 1906
 Aplocnemus strandi Marcu, 1936
 Aplocnemus subcostatus Schilsky, 1894
 Aplocnemus syriacus Schilsky, 1894
 Aplocnemus tarsalis (C.R. Sahlberg, 1822)
 Aplocnemus thessalicus Pic, 1908
 Aplocnemus trinacriensis Ragusa, 1872
 Aplocnemus tuberculifer (Motschulsky, 1850)
 Aplocnemus tumidus Kiesenwetter, 1863
 Aplocnemus uhagoni Schilsky, 1897
 Aplocnemus vestitus Wollaston, 1862
 Aplocnemus virens (Suffrian, 1843)

References

Cleroidea genera